The Battle of Wadi al-Khaznadar, also known as the Third Battle of Homs, was a Mongol victory over the Mamluks in 1299.

Background
In 1260, Hulagu Khan had invaded the Middle East all the way to Palestine. Before he could follow up with an invasion of Egypt, he was called back to Mongolia. He left two tumens (20,000 men) under general Kitbuqa. This army was defeated at the Battle of Ain Jalut and the Mongols were expelled from Palestine and Syria. Hulagu returned with another force, but his invasion was permanently delayed after his cousin Berke of the Golden Horde (who had converted to Islam) secretly allied with the Mamluks and instigated a civil war in the Caucasus.

After recovering the Levant, the Mamluks went on to invade the Armenian Kingdom of Cilicia and the Seljuk Sultanate of Rum, both Mongol protectorates, but they were defeated, forcing them back to Syria.

In 1299, nearly 20 years after the last Mongol defeat in Syria at the Second Battle of Homs, Ghazan Khan and an army of Mongols, Georgians and Armenians, crossed the Euphrates river (the Mamluk-Ilkhanid border) and seized Aleppo. The Mongol army then proceeded southwards until they were only a few miles north of Homs.

The Sultan of Egypt Al-Nasir Muhammad who was in Syria at the time marched an army of 20,000 to 30,000 Mamluks (more, according to other sources) northwards from Damascus until he met the Mongols two to three Arab farsakhs (6–9 miles) north-east of Homs at Wadi al-Khaznadar on the 22nd of December 1299 at 5 o'clock in the morning. The sun had already risen.

Battle

The battle started with the Mamluk cavalry charging the Mongols. Then the Mongol heavy cavalry charged at the Mamluks while Mongol archers stood behind their horses and peppered the Mamluks with arrows.

It seems that early on in the battle, the two forces ended up in hand-to-hand combat. 

Eventually in the afternoon, the Mamluk right flank had been broken through by the Mongols and the Mamluk army began to rout upon hearing about the Mongol breakthrough. Messages between sections of the army could take hours to reach the other side of the battlefield.

The Mongols capitalized on the breakthrough, eventually gaining complete control of the battlefield and routed the remaining Mamluk army.

Casualties
Mamluk sources state that only 200 Mamluk soldiers had been killed whilst Mongol casualties numbered 5,000-10,000. These figures are considered false as an important factor in the battle was the fact that the right flank of the Mamluks had collapsed yet only 200 soldiers died during the entire battle.

Despite the apparent casualty disparity, it is assumed from the fact that the Mongols were left in control of the battlefield and went on to capture Damascus that the Mamluks suffered a "serious reverse".

Aftermath

The Mamluk army fled southwards towards Damascus. However, en route they were constantly harassed by 12,000 Maronite and Druze bowmen. One group of Mongols under general Mulay then split off from Ghazan's main force and pursued the Mamluks as far as Gaza, pushing them back to Egypt.

The Mongols, who had claimed a "great victory", continued their march south until they reached Damascus. The city was soon sacked and its citadel besieged.

There were no concerted Christian efforts to build on the Mongol victories and the Mamluks were soon in repossession of Syria and Palestine after the Mongol withdrawal. Participation of the Georgian and Armenian troops in the campaign was apparently unrelated to the western Christian Crusades.

After the Battle of Wadi al-Khaznadar the Mongols kept pushing into Palestine eventually reaching Jerusalem. Small raiding parties raided all throughout Palestine as far as Gaza until the Mongol army withdrew in 1300 out of need of fodder for their horses and to repel an invasion by the Chagatai Khanate.

References

Sources
 Adh-Dhababi's Record of the Destruction of Damascus by the Mongols in 1299-1301(https://web.archive.org/web/20100124054605/http://www.deremilitari.org/resources/articles/somogyi1.htm)
 
 Amitai-Preiss, Reuven (2009) Mongols and Mamluks: The Mamluk-Ilkhanid War, 1260–1281 (Cambridge Studies in Islamic Civilization). Cambridge University Press, England. , p. 219.
 Mazor, Amir (2015) The Rise and Fall of a Muslim Regiment: The Mansuriyya in the First Mamluk Sultanate, 678/1279-741/1341. Bonn University Press, Germany. 
 Demurger, Alain (2007). Jacques de Molay''. París: Editions Payot & Rivages. .

Battles involving the Ilkhanate
Wadi al-Khazandar
Wadi al-Khazandar
13th century in the Mamluk Sultanate
Battles involving the Mamluk Sultanate
Conflicts in 1299
1299 in the Mongol Empire
13th century in the Kingdom of Georgia
History of the Mongol Empire